At 7:30 am 5 August 2015, two members of the Lashkar-e-Tayyaba  terrorist group attacked a Border Security Force (BSF) convoy in Udhampur, killing two BSF agents and wounding 10 civilians. One of the assailants, Mohammed Naved fled, while his accomplice, Mohammed Noman was killed in the attack. Noman is said to have tried boarding the bus, but was intercepted and killed by CRPF Jawan Suresh Kumar. Naved fled the scene to the Udhampur village, where he took three locals as hostages. He was later overpowered by the hostages and subsequently arrested.

The attack occurred during a period of tension between Pakistan and India; mere days before talks hosted by the National Security Advisor, during which officials on both sides were set to discuss border-related issues between the two countries. Tensions quickly arose when it was discovered the attackers were of Pakistani origin, and claims that Pakistani officials were helping militants cross the Line of Control resurfaced. 

The Lashkar-e-Tayyaba mastermind behind the attack, Abdul Rehman, was killed on October 29th, 2015, in Kulgam, Kashmir, in a joint operation by the Jammu Police, Kashmir Police, and the Indian Army.

Sabzar Bhat, a Hizbul Mujahideen militant and truck driver, was indicted for transporting the two attackers to the site of the attack on August 15.

References

Terrorist incidents in India in 2015